St Paul's Cathedral is a cathedral in London, England.

St. Paul's Cathedral or the Cathedral of Saint Paul or the Cathedral Church of Saint Paul or other variations of the name may also refer to:

Albania 
 St. Paul's Cathedral, Tirana

Australia 
 St Paul's Cathedral, Bendigo
 St Paul's Cathedral, Melbourne
 St Paul's Cathedral, Rockhampton
 St Paul's Cathedral, Sale

Belgium 
 St. Paul's Cathedral, Liège

Canada 
 St. Paul's Cathedral (London, Ontario)
 St. Paul's Cathedral (Regina, Saskatchewan)
 St. Paul's Cathedral (Saskatoon)

China 
 St. Paul's Cathedral, Wenzhou

Côte d'Ivoire 
 St. Paul's Cathedral, Abidjan

Germany 
 St.-Paulus-Dom, Münster

India 
 St. Paul's Cathedral, Kolkata
 St. Paul's Cathedral (Kamloops)

Kenya 
 St Paul's Cathedral, Nairobi attached to the Nairobi University
 St Paul's Cathedral, Embu, a unique African-inspired design and is among the largest in Africa

Macau (People's Republic of China) 
 Cathedral of Saint Paul in Macau

Malta 
 St Paul's Cathedral, Mdina
 St Paul's Pro-Cathedral, Valletta

Mozambique 
 St. Paul's Cathedral, Pemba

New Zealand 
 Saint Paul's Cathedral, Wellington
 St. Paul's Cathedral, Dunedin

Portugal 
 St Paul's Cathedral, Lisbon

Saint Helena  (United Kingdom) 
 Saint Paul's Cathedral (Saint Helena)

South Korea 
 St. Paul's Cathedral, Incheon

Syria 
 Syriac Catholic Cathedral of Saint Paul

Uganda 
 St Paul's Cathedral on Namirembe Hill, Kampala

United Kingdom 
 St Paul's Cathedral, London, England
 Old St Paul's Cathedral, its Gothic predecessor
 St Paul's Cathedral, Dundee, Scotland

United States 
 Cathedral of Saint Paul (Birmingham, Alabama), listed on the NRHP in Alabama
 St. Paul's Cathedral (San Diego), California
 St. Paul's Episcopal Cathedral (Peoria, Illinois)
 Cathedral Church of St. Paul (Springfield, Illinois)
 Cathedral Church of Saint Paul (Des Moines, Iowa), listed on the NRHP in Iowa
 Cathedral Church of St. Paul, Boston, Massachusetts, listed on the NRHP in Massachusetts
 Cathedral of Saint Paul (Worcester, Massachusetts), listed on the NRHP in Massachusetts
 Cathedral Church of St. Paul, Detroit, Michigan, listed on the NRHP in Michigan
 Cathedral of Saint Paul (Minnesota), St. Paul, Minnesota, listed on the NRHP in Minnesota
 St. Paul's Cathedral (Buffalo, New York), listed on the NRHP in New York
 Saint Paul's Episcopal Cathedral (Syracuse, New York), listed on the NRHP in New York
 St. Paul's Cathedral (Oklahoma City), listed on the NRHP in Oklahoma
 Cathedral of St. Paul (Erie, Pennsylvania)
 Cathedral of Saint Paul (Pittsburgh, Pennsylvania), listed on the NRHP in Pennsylvania
 Cathedral Church of St. Paul (Burlington, Vermont)
 St. Paul Cathedral (Yakima, Washington)
 St. Paul's Cathedral (Fond du Lac, Wisconsin)

See also 
 St. Paul's Church (disambiguation)
 Basilica of Saint Paul Outside the Walls

Buildings and structures disambiguation pages